The 2016 All-Ireland Minor Hurling Championship was the 86th staging of the All-Ireland hurling championship since its establishment by the Gaelic Athletic Association in 1928. It is the primary inter-county hurling championship for boys under the age of eighteen. The championship began on 6 April 2016 and ended on 4 September 2016.

Galway entered the championship as the defending champions, however, they were beaten by Tipperary in the All-Ireland semi-final.

On 4 September 2016 Tipperary won the championship following a 1-21 to 0-17 defeat of Limerick in the All-Ireland final. This was their 20th All-Ireland title and their first in four championship seasons.

Provincial championships

Leinster Minor Hurling Championship

Leinster First Round

 The two tier 1 counties are given byes.
 The four tier 2 counties play in two matches.
 The four tier 3 counties play in two matches. The two beaten tier 3 teams are eliminated.

Tier 2

Tier 3

Leinster Second Round

The two tier 1 teams play the two winning tier 2 teams from the first round. The two winning teams advance to the semi-finals. The two beaten teams advance to the quarter-finals.

The two beaten tier 2 teams from the first round play the two winning tier 3 teams from the first round. The two winning teams advance to the quarter-finals. The two beaten teams are eliminated.

Leinster Quarter-Finals

The two beaten teams from the tier1 versus tier 2 matches in the second round play the two winning teams from the tier 2 versus tier 3 matches in the second round.

Leinster Semi-Finals

Leinster Final

Munster Minor Hurling Championship

Munster Quarter-Finals

Munster play-offs

Munster Semi-Finals

Munster Final

Ulster Minor Hurling Championship

Ulster Semi-Finals

Ulster Final

All-Ireland Minor Hurling Championship

All-Ireland Quarter-Finals

All-Ireland Semi-Finals

All-Ireland final

Scoring statistics

Overall

Top scorer in a single game

External links
 2016 Leinster Minor Hurling Championship fixtures
 2015 Munster Minor Hurling Championship fixtures

References

Minor
All-Ireland Minor Hurling Championship